Tecamachalco Fútbol Club was a Mexican football club based in Huixquilucan, State of Mexico. The club played in the Liga Premier Serie B and was not eligible for promotion because the club's stadium does not had a capacity of 15,000.

Players

Current squad

External links
Tercera división

Footnotes

Football clubs in the State of Mexico
Association football clubs established in 2000
2000 establishments in Mexico
Liga Premier de México